The name Metropolis Water Act was given to five Acts of the United Kingdom Parliament:

 Metropolis Water Act 1852
 Metropolis Water Act 1871, an 1871 Act of the Parliament of the United Kingdom
 Metropolis Water Act 1897, an 1897 Act of the Parliament of the United Kingdom
 Metropolis Water Act 1899, an 1899 Act of the Parliament of the United Kingdom
 Metropolis Water Act 1902